Linear order (or total order) is the order of two comparable elements in mathematics.

Linear order may refer to:

 Linear order (linguistics), the order of words or phrases in linguistics
 Dense linear order, in mathematics

See also
 Linearly ordered group